WFC may refer to:

Computer / technology
 Nintendo Wi-Fi Connection
 Wi-Fi calling
 Windows Foundation Classes in Microsoft Visual J++ programming

Economy, Finance
 Wall Financial Corporation, a Vancouver real estate company whose stock symbol on the Toronto Stock Exchange is WFC
 Wells Fargo, a bank whose stock symbol on the NYSE is WFC
 World Financial Center (disambiguation)
 Brookfield Place (New York City), formally known as the World Financial Center
 World Finance Corporation

Sports 
 World Floorball Championships
 World Football Challenge
 Football clubs
 Vancouver Whitecaps FC (MLS)
 Wakefield F.C.
 Walsall F.C.
 Walthamstow F.C.
 Warriors FC
 Watford F.C.
 Wealdstone F.C.
 Weymouth F.C.
 Wimbledon F.C.
 Windsor F.C., any of several football clubs by this name
 Wishaw F.C.
 Woking F.C.
 Women's association football, sometimes Women's Football Club
 Wrexham F.C.

Other organisations and institutions
 Women's Forage Corps
 World Federation of Chiropractic
 WorldFish Center (Penang, Malaysia), international nonprofit organisation; WorldFish is a research programme supported by the CGIAR, a global partnership.
 World Food Council
 World Forestry Congress
 World Future Council
 World Fellowship Center

Physics
 Water Fuel Cell
 Wave function collapse

Other
 Wide Field Camera (disambiguation)
 Woodfree coated paper
 The World Fireworks Championship
 World Fantasy Convention
 Transformers: War for Cybertron
W Form Change, a toy line of action figures for Kamen Rider W